Kim Talon is a Brooklyn-based musician and songwriter from Winnipeg, Manitoba. She is half-Lithuanian, half-Canadian and is a middle child.  

Talon's new project is called Kino Kimino and the debut album was produced by John Agnello and features Sonic Youth members Lee Ranaldo and Steve Shelley. The album entitled "Bait for Sissies" released on June 3, 2016 on Wavves frontman's record label Ghost Ramp in the United States and on My Favourite Chords for Europe and Japan.

Discography

KINO KIMINO 
 Bait is for Sissies (2016) (Ghost Ramp (US) and My Favourite Chords (EUR/JAP)

JAN 
Jan (2012) (Enclaves)

Eagle & Talon 
 In Manila - EP (2011) (Bi/Akka Records)
 Thracian (2009) (Bi/Akka Records)
 Eagle and Talon Cares (2005) (Bi/Akka Records)

References

External links
 Official Website for KINO KIMINO

Musicians from Brooklyn